Pandanus teuszii is a species of plant in the family Pandanaceae. It is endemic to Gabon.

References

Flora of Gabon
teuszii
Data deficient plants
Endemic flora of Gabon
Taxonomy articles created by Polbot